is a former Japanese football player.

Playing career
Soda was born in Sapporo on July 5, 1978. After graduating from University of Tsukuba, he joined J1 League club Consadole Sapporo in 2001. He played many matches as forward from first season. In 2002, he also played as center back not only forward. However the club was relegated to J2 League from 2003. He was completely converted to center back in 2003 and became a regular player. He played many matches as center back for a long time and the club won the champions in 2007 and was promoted to J1 from 2008. However he could hardly play in the match in 2008 and the club was relegated to J2 in a year. On November 17, 2009, he announced his retirement. On November 29, he played as substitute forward from the 87th minute and scored a goal in 89th minute against Yokohama FC. This match is the only his match in 2009 season and his last match in his career.

Club statistics

References

External links

1978 births
Living people
University of Tsukuba alumni
Association football people from Hokkaido
Japanese footballers
J1 League players
J2 League players
Hokkaido Consadole Sapporo players
Association football defenders
Sportspeople from Sapporo